HMS E36 was an E-class submarine built by John Brown, Clydebank for the Royal Navy. She was laid down on 7 January 1915 and was commissioned on 16 November 1916.

There were no survivors. On 15 September 2013, Dutch fisherman Hans Eelman found a large metal object near the island of Texel, using sonar. The object was thought to be the wreck of a submarine of the E-type and was thought to be E36, but later reports proved it was not.

Design
She was powered by two  Vickers eight-cylinder two-stroke diesel engines and two  electric motors.

E36 was armed with a 12-pounder  QF gun mounted forward of the conning tower. She had five 18 inch (450 mm) torpedo tubes, two in the bow, one either side amidships, and one in the stern; a total of 10 torpedoes were carried.

E-Class submarines had wireless systems with  power ratings; in some submarines, these were later upgraded to  systems by removing a midship torpedo tube. Their maximum design depth was  although in service some reached depths of below . Some submarines contained Fessenden oscillator systems.

Crew
Her complement was three officers and 28 men.

References

Bibliography

External links
   Article: World War I submarine found near Texel
  Article: sunken vessel near Texel not submarine after all.
 'Submarine losses 1904 to present day' - Royal Navy Submarine Museum 

 

British E-class submarines of the Royal Navy
Ships built on the River Clyde
1916 ships
World War I submarines of the United Kingdom
World War I shipwrecks in the North Sea
Royal Navy ship names
Maritime incidents in 1917
Submarines sunk in collisions
1917 disasters in the United Kingdom
British submarine accidents
Warships lost with all hands